The Crap Mats is a mountain of the Glarus Alps, overlooking the Rhine valley near Bonaduz in the canton of Graubünden. It lies just south of the Ringelspitz.

References

External links
 Crap Mats on Hikr

Mountains of the Alps
Mountains of Switzerland
Mountains of Graubünden
Two-thousanders of Switzerland